Complete Music is a remix album by English rock band New Order, released on 13 May 2016 by Mute Records. It is an alternative version of the band's tenth studio album, Music Complete (2015), featuring extended versions of all 11 tracks from the original album.

Background
The cover features the same geometric design as Music Complete, with a modified colour palette. Two new exclusive mixes of "Nothing but a Fool" and "Superheated" are included, which are different from those on the eight-LP vinyl box set of Music Complete.

Of the release, Bernard Sumner explained:"We've given [the music] to different mixers, and they've chopped it up and rearranged it and stripped it back, so it's like another take on the original album [...] Some of [the songs] are radically different, but rather than like a remixer who would write a new set of music, they used the music that we'd already incorporated in the songs, but warped it in a way that was very interesting."

Track listing

Charts

References

2016 remix albums
Mute Records remix albums
New Order (band) remix albums